Galerie Urs Meile, Beijing-Lucerne is a contemporary art gallery located in Lucerne (Switzerland) and Beijing (China).

History and artistic programme
The gallery was founded by Urs Meile (the son of an art collector) in 1992.  

Its Beijing gallery opened in 2006 and was originally located in Caochangdi, but in May 2017 it opened a new space in a former warehouse in the 798 Art District.

Galerie Urs Meile participates at Art Basel, Art Basel Hong Kong, and Art Basel Miami Beach.

References

External links
 Galerie Urs Meile, Beijing-Lucerne website
 麦勒画廊, 北京-卢森  

1992 establishments in Switzerland
2006 establishments in China
Art galleries established in 1992
Contemporary art galleries in China
Contemporary art galleries in Switzerland
Organisations based in Lucerne
Buildings and structures in Lucerne
Buildings and structures in Beijing
Culture in Beijing
Tourist attractions in Beijing